M.G. Siegler (born November 2, 1981) is a general partner at Google Ventures, where he primarily focuses on seed and early-stage investments.

Early life and education

He is originally from Ohio, and obtained his B.S. from the University of Michigan in 2004.

Career

After graduation, he moved out to Los Angeles to get a job in Hollywood, and took on tasks such as a set PA and a script reader. He then moved to San Diego, where he did front-end web development. During his stint as a web developer, he started taking blogging more seriously, which helped him get noticed by VentureBeat. He became a blogger for VentureBeat from 2007 to 2009, and a blogger for TechCrunch from 2009 to 2014. As a blogger, much of his blogging focused on Apple, and he was "known best for his unabashed pro-Apple bias". He became a partner at CrunchFund in 2011, where he helped build a portfolio including Airbnb, Betable, Crowdtilt, Ifttt, Karma, Mailbox, Path, Square, Uber, Vine, and Yammer. He left CrunchFund for Google Ventures in May 2013.

He serves on the board for Slack. He has invested in companies like Medium and Secret. He regularly maintains a blog on Medium called "500ish Words", and was interviewed in the documentary The Startup Kids.

References

External links
TechCrunch blog entries

1981 births
American venture capitalists
Living people
University of Michigan alumni
Businesspeople from Ohio